Christophoro d'Authier de Sisgau, O.S.B. (1609–1667) was a Roman Catholic prelate who served as Titular Bishop of Bethlehem (1651–1667).

Biography
Christophoro d'Authier de Sisgau was born in Marseille, France, on 6 April 1609 and ordained a priest in the Order of Saint Benedict.
On 27 February 1651, Christophoro d'Authier de Sisgau was appointed during the papacy of Pope Innocent X as Titular Bishop of Bethlehem.
On 26 March 1651, he was consecrated bishop by Bernardino Spada, Cardinal-Priest of San Pietro in Vincoli with Giorgio Bolognetti, Bishop of Rieti, and Persio Caracci, Bishop of Larino, serving as co-consecrators. 
He served as Titular Bishop of Bethlehem until his death on 17 September 1667.

References 

17th-century Roman Catholic titular bishops
Bishops appointed by Pope Innocent X
1609 births
1667 deaths
Benedictine bishops